Tracker is a file indexing and search framework for Linux and other Unix-like systems. It is written in the C programming language.

Tracker has been adopted by the GNOME desktop environment and is heavily integrated into GNOME Shell and GNOME Files.

One of the developers of the Conduit application has suggested using Tracker to create "a metadata-enabled GNOME", similar to using Strigi as an indexer for a metadata framework in KDE Software Compilation 4.

See also

 Strigi
 NEPOMUK
 Baloo (software)
 WinFS
 Desktop search
 List of desktop search engines

References

External links
 Tracker wikipage on GNOME Wiki
 Tracker repository on GNOME GitLab
 A first look at Tracker 0.6.0

Applications using D-Bus
Beta software
Desktop search engines